South Tipperary County Council was the authority responsible for local government in the county of South Tipperary, Ireland. The council had 26 elected members. The head of the council had the title of Cathaoirleach (Chairperson). The county town was Clonmel.

Originally South Tipperary County Council held its meetings in Clonmel Courthouse. The county council moved to new facilities in Emmet Street, latterly known as the County Hall, in 1927.

On 26 July 2011, the Minister for the Environment, Community and Local Government, Phil Hogan, announced the proposed merger of North Tipperary County Council and South Tipperary County Council. It was abolished on 3 June 2014 when the Local Government Reform Act 2014 was implemented. It was succeeded by Tipperary County Council.

For the purpose of elections the county was divided into five local electoral areas: Cahir (4), Cashel (4), Clonmel (7), Fethard (6), and Tipperary (5).

References

Politics of South Tipperary
Former local authorities in the Republic of Ireland
2014 disestablishments in Ireland
History of County Tipperary